Haluzice is a village and municipality in Nové Mesto nad Váhom District in the Trenčín Region of western Slovakia.

History
In historical records the village was first mentioned in 1299. A Romanesque church was built in the village by the Counts Cseszneky de Milvány. Later it was part of estates of Beckov castle.

Geography
The municipality lies at an altitude of 270 metres and covers an area of 3.841 km². It has a population of about 55 people.

Genealogical resources

The records for genealogical research are available at the state archive "Statny Archiv in Bratislava, Slovakia"

 Roman Catholic church records (births/marriages/deaths): 1691-1895 (parish B)
 Lutheran church records (births/marriages/deaths): 1784-1900 (parish B)

See also
 List of municipalities and towns in Slovakia

References

External links

 Official page
Surnames of living people in Haluzice

Villages and municipalities in Nové Mesto nad Váhom District